Sogratl is a rural locality (a selo) and the administrative centre of Sogratlinsky Selsoviet, Gunibsky District, Republic of Dagestan, Russia. The population was 2,360 as of 2010. There are 4 streets.

Geography 
Sogratl is located 25 km south of Gunib (the district's administrative centre) by road, on the Tsamtichay River. Obokh and Shangoda are the nearest rural localities.

References 

Rural localities in Gunibsky District